Researcher is a streamliner dragster, sponsored by National Speed Products.

Designed by Chuck Tanko in 1971, the car was a fairly conventional rear-engined dragster, except for a winglet (similar to the one Tony Nancy used the same year) between the front wheels. It used a Race Car Specialties chassis with a  wheelbase (long, by the standards of the era) and was bodied in aluminum by Kenny Ellis, who also drove it. Powered by a  Chrysler hemi, it qualified for the last-ever NHRA Top Gas event, the 1971 NHRA Supernationals at Ontario, California.

Notes

Sources
 Taylor, Thom.  "Beauty Beyond the Twilight Zone" in Hot Rod, April 2017, pp. 30–43.

1970s cars
Drag racing cars
Rear-wheel-drive vehicles